"Walter Taffet" is the seventh episode of third season of the American television drama series The Americans, and the 33rd overall episode of the series. It originally aired on March 11, 2015, in the United States on FX.

Plot
At the FBI, agent Aderholt finds that Gaad's pen is bugged. Martha, who planted the bug under the guise of the classified audit of the bureau, panics. She meets Phillip as "Clark" but hesitates to tell him about the incident. Feeling that something is wrong about him, she asks to see his apartment. Elsewhere, Phillip and Elizabeth found that the student operative, brought to their attention by Hans, is about to incite an attack and blame it on student protesters. The Jennings are planning to catch him. These plans are realized in the final five minutes of the episode.

Production
The episode was written by Lara Shapiro and directed by cast member Noah Emmerich, marking his directorial debut.

References

External links
 
 "Walter Taffet" at EW
 "S3 · E7 · Walter Taffet" at tunefind.com

2015 American television episodes
The Americans (season 3) episodes